Nardophyllum is a genus of South American flowering plants in the tribe Astereae within the family Asteraceae.

 Species

References

Asteraceae genera
Astereae
Flora of South America